Apostolos Giannou (born 25 January 1990) is a Greek-Australian professional footballer who plays as a forward for Indian Super League club Kerala Blasters. He represented various Greek and Australian youth national teams, including one friendly with the Greece national team, before appearing competitively for the Australia national team.

Club career

Early life and career
Giannou was born in Naousa, Greece, but moved to Australia at a young age and grew up in Melbourne, Victoria. In Australia he was known as Paul.

Giannou played junior football for Oakleigh Cannons and South Melbourne. Following state representative honours at under-14 and under-15 level, Giannou was selected for the VIS by Ernie Merrick. At the Victorian Institute of Sport, he trained alongside Andreas Govas, Matthew Spiranovic, Adrian Leijer, Leigh Broxham, Milos Lujic, Dimitri Hatzimouratis and Matthew Theodore.

He took part in Melbourne Victory's pre-season friendlies prior to the 2006–07 A-League season with an intention of being signed in an apprenticeship capacity. However, Giannou secured a two-week trial with PSV Eindhoven's Reserve and Academy teams. Giannou was assured that if he did not sign with the Dutch club, he could return to Melbourne Victory. Despite the unsuccessful trial, Giannou came back to Melbourne and signed a six-month contract with Victorian Premier League side Oakleigh Cannons.

Apollon Kalamarias
On 2007, Giannou was transferred to Greek first division side Apollon Kalamarias. Giannou netted his first goal for Apollon Kalamarias in late 2008, an 81st minute consolation goal in a 3–1 defeat at home to Kerkyra. Giannou would go on to score 5 more times in the 2008–2009 Beta Ethniki season before being transferred to Kavala, who had gained promotion to Superleague Greece for the 2009–10 season, on a five-year contract.

Kavala
On 21 November 2009 Giannou debuted for Kavala where he was substituted on after 79 minutes, after being played through on goal Giannou neatly passed the ball into the back of the net on the 88th minute mark to seal a 2–1 victory against AEK Athens. Down the track, Giannou was one of five Australians in the Greek side as the club welcomed the arrivals of Robert Stambolziev, Zeljko Kalac, Andreas Govas and Craig Moore.

PAOK
After the relegation of Kavala, Zisis Vryzas had brought him to PAOK and Giannou was set free and on 30 September 2011 signed a three-year-contract with P.A.O.K.  He made his first appearance for the club during the 2011–12 season in a 0–0 draw against OFI on 16 October, where he was substituted onto the field for Vladimir Ivic in the 78th minute. Giannou scored his first goals for the club, a brace, in a 2–0 away victory against OFI on 11 February.

Panionios

On 2 September 2013 Panionios proceeded to a significant addition to its roster, by announcing the acquisition of Giannou. The 23-year-old striker was released by PAOK, as it was not in the plans of Huub Stevens, but did not stay for long time as unemployed and immediately signing a two-years' contract with the club.

Asteras Tripolis
On 9 June 2015, Giannou signed a three years' contract with Asteras Tripoli for an undisclosed fee. He scored on his debut against Panthrakikos F.C. he also scored 2 matchdays later a penalty against Kaloni F.C. On 27 September 2015, on the 5th day of the 2015–16 season he scored in a 2–1 away loss against Levadiakos. On 5 October 2015, he scored the only goal of his club in a 1–1 home draw against Platanias F.C. On 25 October 2015, after three consecutive unsuccessful results, he scored twice, one with a penalty-kick in the 2–1 away win against PAS Giannina. He was named man of the match.
On 5 November 2015, Asteras Tripoli ended a run of seven European games without a win to breathe life into their flagging group campaign, by winning APOEL. Giannou scored the second goal in a 2–0 home win in the extra time of first half after Pablo Mazza's assist.
It was his first goal in UEFA campaigns. On 29 November 2015, was anointed scorer with a second attempt after the successful repulse of the penalty from Roberto in overtime in a 3–1 away loss against Greek champions Olympiakos. On 5 December 2015, he scored the only goal in the 2–1 home loss against Iraklis, that keeping the unbeaten tradition against Asteras Tripoli. On 2 January 2016, he scored twice to a comfortable 4–0 home win against Panthrakikos. With these goals, he scored his eleventh goal in this year's season setting a new personal season's scoring record after last year's 10 goals with Panionios.

On 20 February 2016, the Chinese club Shanghai Shenhua offer more than €2 million to buy 26-year-old striker of Asteras Tripolis. The Greek club ask for at least €3 million to sell its first scorer, who can not be replaced with a transfer until summer, while Giannou seems to have already agreed terms with the team of his compatriot, Avraam Papadopoulos, which offers him more than €1 million for every year of contract.

Guangzhou R&F
On 24 February 2016, Giannou has agreed to continue his career at the Chinese club Guangzhou R&F instead of Shanghai Shenhua. Asteras Tripolis have accepted a bid of €2.5 million for the Greek striker who is heading to China to undergo medical and complete his move. Giannou has agreed terms with Guangzhou with a lucrative three years' contract of €1.6 million yearly.

AEK Larnaca
On 25 January 2018, Guangzhou R&F confirmed that Giannou joined AEK Larnaca.

OFI
On 22 September 2020, Giannou after leaving AEK Larnaca, has decided to continue his career in Greece, signing a two-years deal with OFI Crete F.C., for an undisclosed fee.

Macarthur FC
On 13 January 2022, Giannou after leaving OFI, has decided to continue his career in Australia, signing a deal with Macarthur FC, for an undisclosed fee.

Kerala Blasters
On 8 July 2022, Indian Super League club Kerala Blasters announced Giannou as the club's first foreign signing ahead of the 2022–23 season. Giannou's Indian Super League debut with the Blasters came on 7 October 2022 in a 3–1 win against East Bengal on the opening day of the 2022–23 season. He scored his first goal for the club on 11 December against their southern rivals Bengaluru FC, where he scored the third goal for the Blasters within two minutes after coming as a substitute in the 68th minute as the Blasters won the match 3–2 at full-time.

International career
In 2006, Giannou represented the Australia under-17 team at the AFC U-17 Championship 2006 Qualification. Giannou scored in Australia's 3–1 win against Indonesia. Giannou was the only Victorian player selected for Australia's under-17 side that took part in the International Youth Football tournament in Niigata, Japan. The team finished top of their respective group as Giannou scored a goal in a 5–1 win against Albirex Niigata.

In July 2008, Giannou was listed in a group of Australian footballers aged between 16 to 22 known as "the lost boys", including Dean Bouzanis, Andreas Govas and Robert Stambolziev, who were likely to play for or had played for national teams of the country of their heritage.

In 2008, Giannou represented the Greece under-19 team at the 2008 UEFA European Under-19 Football Championship elite qualification where Greece qualified for the Championship finals, he played alongside Australian Dean Bouzanis. Under coach Alexis Alexiou, Giannou appeared twice at the European Under-19 Championships when he was substituted on in a 1–1 draw against Italy and started in a 3–0 loss against England as Greece finished at the bottom of their group.

On 5 September 2010, Giannou returned to the international stage after two years' absence, he was selected for the Greece under-21 team for a 2011 European Under-21 Championship qualifier against the Macedonia which Greece won 2–1.

On 24 March 2015, Giannou was selected but did not appear for the Greece national team for the UEFA Euro 2016 qualifying match against Hungary.

On 5 November 2015, Giannou was selected but did not appear for the Greece national team for the friendly matches against Luxembourg and Turkey. On 17 November, he made his debut appearance with Greece as a late substitute for Kostas Mitroglou in a 0–0 away draw against Turkey.

He was capped by Greece, on 25 February 2016, but Giannou declared his intent to play for Australia.

Giannou was called up for Australia for the 2018 World Cup qualifiers against Tajikistan and Jordan on 9 March 2016. Giannou made his debut for Australia in a 7–0 win against Tajikistan on 24 March 2016. He assisted Massimo Luongo for Australia's first goal of the match, and won two penalties for Australia, which were converted by Mile Jedinak and Mark Milligan for Australia's second and third goals.

Career statistics

Club

International

International goals
Scores and results list Australia's goal tally first.

Honours
AEK Larnaca
Cypriot Cup: 2017–18

References

External links
 Apostolos Giannou at Australian Football DataBase
 
 
 
 
 Apostolos Giannou at contra.gr

Living people
1990 births
Association football forwards
Australian soccer players
Australia international soccer players
Greek emigrants to Australia
Greek footballers
Greece international footballers
Greece youth international footballers
Greece under-21 international footballers
Kavala F.C. players
Apollon Pontou FC players
PAOK FC players
Panionios F.C. players
Asteras Tripolis F.C. players
Oakleigh Cannons FC players
Guangzhou City F.C. players
AEK Larnaca FC players
OFI Crete F.C. players
Macarthur FC players
Super League Greece players
Chinese Super League players
Cypriot First Division players
Expatriate footballers in China
Australian Institute of Sport soccer players
Dual internationalists (football)
2019 AFC Asian Cup players
Footballers from Naousa, Imathia
Kerala Blasters FC players
Indian Super League players